Prići is a village in the municipality of Travnik, Bosnia and Herzegovina.

Demographics 
According to the 2013 census, its population was 198, all Croats.

References

Populated places in Travnik